Joarlem Batista Santos, known as Jô (born 1 May 1995) is a Brazilian professional footballer who plays as a forward for Chaves in Primeira Liga.

Club statistics (Japan only)
Updated to end of 2018 season.

References

External links

1995 births
Living people
Brazilian footballers
Brazilian expatriate footballers
Association football forwards
J2 League players
União São João Esporte Clube players
Mogi Mirim Esporte Clube players
Marília Atlético Clube players
Capivariano Futebol Clube players
Esporte Clube Taubaté players
Associação Atlética Francana players
Esporte Clube Comercial (MS) players
Clube Atlético Linense players
Mito HollyHock players
Grêmio Esportivo Juventus players
S.C. Covilhã players
Brazilian expatriate sportspeople in Japan
Brazilian expatriate sportspeople in Portugal
Expatriate footballers in Japan
Expatriate footballers in Portugal